Lies That Chelsea Handler Told Me is the fourth book by American comedian Chelsea Handler that was published in May 2011.  This book was a part of a three book deal Handler signed in November 2010.  The book was followed by a "Lies That Chelsea Handler Told Me" Tour, on which Handler was accompanied by the Comedians of Chelsea Lately.

Synopsis 
The book consists of humorous essays written by Handler's coworkers and family members about lies and pranks Handler has pulled on them.

Essays 
The chapters (essays) are in the book as follows, with the authors name in parenthesis

Zookeeper (Johnny Kansas)
Pap Smears and Punctuation Marks (Stephanie Stehling)
How to Make a Marriage Work (Heather McDonald)
A Brother's Testimony (Roy Handler)
My Name is Brad Wollack and I'm Unattractive (Brad Wollack)
Dial tone, a Chelsea Specialty (Amber Mazzola)
Go Lakers (Josh Wolf)
Sisterly Love (Shoshonna Handler)
Eva is My Name, Comedy is My Game (Eva Magdalenski)
Lies and Other Things I Wish Were Lies (Amy Meyer)
Pubescent and Adolescent Mendacity, 1985-1991 (Glen Handler)
Standards and Practices
Raise the Woof (Chunk)

References

External links 
 Chelsea Handler

Essay collections
2011 non-fiction books
Books by Chelsea Handler
Grand Central Publishing books